Samuel H. "Sam" Smith (born August 10, 1955) is an American politician and former Republican member of the Pennsylvania House of Representatives for the 66th District who served from 1986 to 2015. The district included portions of Jefferson, Indiana and Armstrong counties. He was elected Speaker in January 2011 and served until January 2015, when he was succeeded by Mike Turzai.

Biography
Born August 10, 1955 in Punxsutawney, Pennsylvania, Smith attended and graduated from Punxsutawney Area High School and later earned a bachelor's degree in journalism from Penn State University. After working for several years in the construction industry, he later took a job with the Pennsylvania Department of Revenue. In 1986 Smith was elected to succeed his father, Eugene "Snuffy" Smith, who had represented the 66th district since 1963.

He served as Minority Leader from 2007 through 2010, and spoke for his party on the floor and led debate on major issues. Prior to the Democratic takeover in the 2006 election, Smith served as Majority Leader where he was responsible for planning, discussion, debate and final passage of legislation. He was also majority whip until 2003.

Following the 2010 election, which saw Republicans regain their House majority, Smith was elected Speaker when the House reconvened.

Personal
Smith serves on the Indiana University of Pennsylvania Council of Trustees and the Punxsutawney College Trust that supports the Punxsutawney Campus of IUP. With Gobbler's Knob in the heart of his district, Smith is a long-standing member of the Punxsutawney Groundhog Club.

He is married to Donna Bruder-Smith and has a son, Zachary and a daughter, Alexandra.

See also

 Speaker of the Pennsylvania House of Representatives

References

External links
State Representative Sam Smith official caucus website
Samuel H. Smith (R) official PA House website

Follow the Money – Sam Smith
2006 2004 2002 2000 1998 campaign contributions

1955 births
Living people
People from Punxsutawney, Pennsylvania
Methodists from Pennsylvania
Republican Party members of the Pennsylvania House of Representatives
Donald P. Bellisario College of Communications alumni
21st-century American politicians